The Nokia 6303 classic is a mobile telephone handset produced by Finnish manufacturer Nokia. The Nokia 6303 classic was announced in December 2008, it has been in production since May 2009. It is the successor to the Nokia 6300 (even though PhoneArena claims the Nokia 6700 classic was the successor).

The Nokia 6303 classic was being produced in Hungary as well as in Jucu, Romania.

Features 
The phone supports MicroSD cards up to 32 GB, meaning that the phone can be used practically as an MP3 player. Using the supplied and freely available Nokia PC Suite, one has the option of converting MP3s to e-AAC for more compression. The 3.5 mm headphone jack means that many standard commercial headsets will fit the phone. Like most other recent Nokia phones, the 6303 classic replaced their old Pop-Port connector for a standard micro-USB connector.

The phone allows the user to view the video clips in full-screen landscape mode and set the fast-forward/rewind interval from a few seconds to minutes. Improved audio quality for music playback was also noted for this firmware version, thus making the Nokia 6303 classic a music phone similar to its counterparts, the Nokia XpressMusic. In addition, video clips can replace ringtones so that an actual motion picture is shown while there is an incoming call.

Nokia announced the "i" version of the 6303 classic phone in February 2010 which was released in March that year. The 3.2-megapixel camera lacked autofocus and video recording was now done at 240×320 at 8 frames per second. It has been refreshed with a new UI and new graphics. The 6303i classic supports up to 8 GB (16 GB according to some sources) MicroSD cards, supplied with 2 GB instead of 1 GB. The internal memory has also been raised to 55 MB. The battery life has been enhanced to 515 hours of standby and 8 hours talk time. It now comes with 7 inbuilt games instead of four (the 6303 had Bounce Tales, Brain Champ, City Bloxx and Sudoku where the 6303i has those 4 games, plus the additional games which are Block'd, High Roller casino and Rally Stars). The 6303i classic has faced negative reviews due to the camera downgrade. These models are not available in 2019 on the Nokia website but can be bought from online shops.

Reception
Although the 6303 classic has smartphone features, it is more user-friendly and straightforward. It is aimed for users who want a reliable and stylish phone, used mostly for calling and texting.

Specification sheet

References

6303i
Mobile phones introduced in 2009